François Trucy (born 9 June 1931) is a former member of the Senate of France, who represented the Var department.  He is a member of the Union for a Popular Movement.

References
Page on the Senate website

1931 births
Living people
Mayors of Toulon
French Senators of the Fifth Republic
Union for French Democracy politicians
20th-century French physicians
French biologists
Union for a Popular Movement politicians
Senators of Var (department)